The Martison mine is a large mine located in Ontario. Martison represents one of the largest phosphates reserve in Canada having estimated reserves of 117.9 million tonnes of ore grading 22% P2O5.

References 

Phosphate mines in Canada